This is a list of golfers that won a PGA Tour tournament as amateur golfers since 1945. No golfer was able to achieve the feat during the 1960s or 1970s, after which one golfer was able to win as an amateur in 1985, followed by another golfer in 1991. Under PGA Tour rules, if a golfer plays as an amateur, they may not collect their winnings – nor can they turn professional while they are playing in a tournament. Winning a PGA Tour tournament as an amateur is a feat has been achieved by seven golfers in this timeframe, with the only golfer to win more than once as an amateur being Frank Stranahan, who did so four times. As the list also exhibits, no tournament has been won by an amateur golfer more than once.

References

Lists of male golfers
PGA Tour amateur wins
Amateur golf